MarqTran is a public bus system located in the Marquette, Michigan area in the United States that provides basic transportation needs to people throughout Marquette County. The MarqTran bus is the county's only mass transit system.

Routes 
MarqTran operates almost everywhere in Marquette County.
The daily service routes in Marquette County are:
 Ishpeming/Negaunee/Marquette: service from the Ishpeming Senior Center to Marquette with stops along the way in Negaunee, Negaunee Township and Marquette Township.
 Ishpeming Shopper's Shuttle: loop through downtown Ishpeming including stops at the Valente Medical Center.
 Marquette/Sawyer/Gwinn: loop from Marquette down M-553 to K.I. Sawyer, Gwinn and over to US 41 through the Skandia area to Harvey and back to Marquette.
 Negaunee Shuttle: a loop through the downtown and surrounding area of Negaunee with service to the adjacent downtown of Ishpeming.
 Marquette Trowbridge Park: a loop between the MarqTran facility, Northern Michigan University, Marquette General Hospital, and Trowbridge Park.
 Marquette North/Mall: service between downtown Marquette, Westwood and Marquette Malls.
 Marquette North: service between NMU, the Peninsula Medical Center, MGH and downtown areas.
 Marquette South: service on the south side of town between Econo Foods, the Jacobetti Veterans Facility and neighbors of South Marquette.
 Marquette Shopper Shuttle: provides service between Wal-Mart, Super One Foods/Westwood Mall, Target, Goodwill, and Marquette Mall.

The following routes do not operate daily:
 Marquette/Gwinn/Palmer: a loop on Fridays only through Marquette, Gwinn and up M-35 to Palmer back to Marquette.
 Western Marquette County: a route from Marquette to Koski Korners (corner of US 41/M-28 and M-95 and Republic.

Other information
MarqTran buses are unmistakable blue and white buses that travel throughout Marquette County. MarqTran offers rides to students in the Marquette Area for half-fare.

The bus station is located on Commerce Drive behind the Westwood Mall, next to Wright Street. The former bus station in downtown Marquette is home of the Marquette County Historical Society Museum.

MarqTran offers door to door services, at a nominal price.

They also connect to Indian Trails regional bus transportation, which connects to Escanaba and points north.

External links 
MarqTran home page

Bus transportation in Michigan
Transportation in Marquette County, Michigan